Poessa is a monotypic genus of Malagasy jumping spiders containing the single species, Poessa argenteofrenata. It was first described by Eugène Louis Simon in 1902, and is only found on Madagascar.

References

Monotypic Salticidae genera
Salticidae
Spiders of Madagascar